Finland competed at the 2002 Winter Olympics in Salt Lake City, Utah, United States. The nation won all Nordic combined events, most notably Samppa Lajunen, in the individual events.

Medalists

Alpine skiing

Men

Women

Biathlon

Men

Men's 4 × 7.5 km relay

Women

Women's 4 × 7.5 km relay

 1 A penalty loop of 150 metres had to be skied per missed target. 
 2 Starting delay based on 10 km sprint results. 
 3 One minute added per missed target. 
 4 Starting delay based on 7.5 km sprint results.

Cross-country skiing

Men
Sprint

Pursuit

 1 Starting delay based on 10 km C. results. 
 C = Classical style, F = Freestyle

4 × 10 km relay

Women
Sprint

Pursuit
{|class="wikitable" border="1" style="font-size:90%"
|-
!rowspan=2|Athlete
!colspan=2|5 km C
!colspan=2|5 km F pursuit2
|-
!Time
!Rank
!Time
!Final rank
|-
|Elina Pienimäki-Hietamäki
|align=center|14:21.3
|align=center|43 Q
|align=center|13:39.5
|align=center|40
|-
|Kati Sundqvist-Venäläinen
|align=center|13:54.4
|align=center|21 Q
|align=center|13:11.9
|align=center|16
|-
|Satu Salonen
|align=center|13:43.4
|align=center|11 Q'' 
|align=center|13:34.3
|align=center|36
|-
|Kaisa Varis
|align=center|13:37.9
|align=center|9 Q|align=center|12:37.8
|align=center|12
|}

 2 Starting delay based on 5 km C. results. 
 C = Classical style, F = Freestyle4 × 5 km relayCurling

Men's tournament

Group stage
Top four teams advanced to semi-finals.

|}ContestantsFigure skating

Women

Freestyle skiing

Men

Women

 Ice hockey

Men's tournament

First round - Group D

Quarter final

 Team roster 

Women's tournament

First round - Group B
Top two teams (shaded) advanced to semifinals.

Medal roundSemi-finalBronze medal game Team roster 

 Nordic combined Men's sprintEvents:
 large hill ski jumping
 7.5 km cross-country skiing Men's individualEvents:
 normal hill ski jumping
 15 km cross-country skiing Men's Team'''

Four participants per team.

Events:
 normal hill ski jumping
 5 km cross-country skiing

Ski jumping 

Men's team large hill

 1 Four teams members performed two jumps each.

Snowboarding

Men's halfpipe

Women's halfpipe

Speed skating

Men

References

 Olympic Winter Games 2002, full results by sports-reference.com

Nations at the 2002 Winter Olympics
2002
2002 in Finnish sport